Wyler's is a food and beverage brand established by Wyler's Company in 1931. The brand is now owned by Kraft Heinz for bouillon and dry soup mixes and by The Jel Sert Company for powdered drink mixes.

History
The spouses Silvain and Arma Wyler established Wyler's Company in 1931 selling its first product, chicken bouillon cubes. Wyler's began manufacturing bouillon cubes in Chicago in the 1940s and developed bouillon powder, dry soup mixes and powdered drink mixes in the 1950s. 

Borden acquired Wyler's Company in 1961.

The Wyler's powdered drink business was sold to Lipton in 1986. Jel Sert bought the Wyler's powdered drink business from Lipton parent Unilever in 1994.

When Borden exited the food business in 2001, it sold the Wyler's bouillon and dry soup business to H. J. Heinz Company. H. J. Heinz Company would merge with Kraft Foods in 2015, creating Kraft Heinz.

References

External links
  (Food brand)
  (Drink brand)

Heinz brands
Jel Sert brands
Food product brands
Drink brands
Products introduced in 1931